Ernest Albert Baker (1869–1941) was an author, and editor of English fiction, dictionaries, and librarianship, besides books and journalism on outdoor activities, particularly caving. He wrote a standard reference, The History of the English Novel, first published in ten volumes between 1924 and 1939. Baker also wrote A Guide to Historical Fiction (1914), an overview of Historical fiction in novels and short stories. His caving books were Moors, Crags and Caves of the High Peak and Neighbourhood (1900); (with Herbert E. Balch), The Netherworld of Mendip; Explorations in the Great Caverns of Somerset, Yorkshire, Derbyshire & elsewhere (1907), and Caving; Episodes of Underground Exploration (1932).

References

External links

20th-century English non-fiction writers
English bibliographers
English editors
British cavers
1869 births
1941 deaths